Fritz Strobl (born 24 August 1972 in Lienz, Austria) is a former World Cup alpine ski racer.

Strobl was the gold medalist in the downhill at the 2002 Winter Olympics in Salt Lake City, run on the Grizzly course at Snowbasin.

In his final season in 2007, he was the silver medalist in the super-G at the World Championships in Åre, Sweden.

Strobl competed on the World Cup circuit for 15 seasons and recorded 9 victories: seven in downhill and two in super-G.  He had 31 podium finishes (top 3) and 110 top ten finishes.

He finished second in the downhill standings in 2002 and 2006, and third in 1997 and 2001.  His best finish in the overall standings was fifth in 2005. 

Strobl is of a handful of racers to have twice won the Hahnenkamm downhill at Kitzbühel (1997 and 2000).  He still holds the record time for finishing the full Streif course in 1:51.58, an average speed of 66.4 mph (106.9 km/h), set in 1997.
Strobl retired from international competition at age 34, at the conclusion of the 2007 season.

In his final race on 15 March 2007, Strobl descended the Lenzerheide super-G course dressed as Mozart.

World Cup results

Season standings

Race victories
9 wins – (7 DH, 2 SG)
31 podiums – (25 DH, 6 SG)

^ course record

World Championship results

Olympic results

Discography
 Genie auf die Ski (2007) No. 2 Austria

References

External links
 Fritz Strobl.com – official site
 
 Fritz Strobl World Cup standings at the International Ski Federation
 
 

1972 births
Austrian male alpine skiers
Alpine skiers at the 1998 Winter Olympics
Alpine skiers at the 2002 Winter Olympics
Alpine skiers at the 2006 Winter Olympics
Olympic alpine skiers of Austria
Medalists at the 2002 Winter Olympics
Olympic medalists in alpine skiing
Olympic gold medalists for Austria
People from Lienz
Living people
Recipients of the Decoration of Honour for Services to the Republic of Austria
Sportspeople from Tyrol (state)